Stade Marcel-Verchère is rugby union stadium located in Bourg-en-Bresse, Ain.  It is the home ground of Union Sportive Bressane, promoted to Rugby Pro D2 (the second level of French club rugby) for the 2013–14 season.  It has a capacity of 11,400. Moreover, the team of Football Bourg-en-Bresse Péronnas 01 playing in this stadium and evolve in Championnat National.

The stadium is named in memory of Marcel Verchère, a Bressane player who died following a violent tackle during a match against Oyonnax on 24 September 1937.

References

Marcel-Verchere
Football venues in France
Sports venues in Ain